Musa Noah Kamara (born 6 August 2000) is a Sierra Leonean footballer who plays as a striker for Al-Ittihad and the Sierra Leone national team.

Club career
Kamara was born in Tombo. After playing for AIK Freetong in 2018, he was the top scorer of the 2019 Sierra Leone National Premier League with 15 goals for champions East End Lions. He joined Swedish club Trelleborgs FF on a three-and-a-half year deal in August 2019, but cancelled his contract after a week, citing the cold weather in Sweden. He retracted that statement the following day however, and insisted that he returned to Sierra Leone to play for the national team in the upcoming World Cup qualification fixtures.  He transferred to Bo Rangers in April 2021.

International career
Having previously represented Sierra Leone at under-20 level, Kamara made his senior debut for Sierra Leone against Liberia on 26 July 2018. He represented Sierra Leone at the 2019 WAFU Cup of Nations. He did not travel to Kono to play a friendly match in November 2019 after suffering a bereavement, but received a two match international ban from the Sierra Leone Football Association after it was discovered he played a community match in Freetown during this period.

Kamara was called up to Sierra Leone's squad for the 2021 Africa Cup of Nations tournament, which began in January 2022. He scored his first international goal with a "magnificent left-footed strike" in a 2–2 draw with Ivory Coast in Sierra Leone's second group match on 16 January 2022. He appeared in their third group match as they were eliminated from the competition after a 1–0 defeat to Equatorial Guinea.

References

External links

2000 births
Living people
Sierra Leonean footballers
Sierra Leone international footballers
People from Western Area Rural District
Association football forwards
East End Lions F.C. players
Trelleborgs FF players
Bo Rangers F.C. players
Sierra Leonean expatriate footballers
Sierra Leonean expatriate sportspeople in Sweden
Sierra Leonean expatriate sportspeople in Ethiopia
Expatriate footballers in Sweden
Expatriate footballers in Ethiopia
Hadiya Hossana F.C. players
2021 Africa Cup of Nations players